The Michigan State Spartans baseball team is the varsity intercollegiate athletic team of the Michigan State University in East Lansing, Michigan, United States. The team competes in the National Collegiate Athletic Association's Division I and are members of the Big Ten Conference.

Head coaches

Michigan State in the NCAA tournament

References

External links